"1 2 3" is a song by American rapper Moneybagg Yo featuring American rapper Blac Youngsta, from the former's third studio album Time Served (2020). It was sent to rhythmic contemporary radio on April 14, 2020, as the third single of the album. The music video was released on the same day.

Chart performance
123 missed the US Billboard Hot 100 chart, peaking at number one on the US Bubbling Under Hot 100 chart. On August 18, 2020, the album was certified gold by the Recording Industry Association of America (RIAA) for combined sales and streaming data of over 500,000 units in the United States.

Charts

Certifications

References 

2020 singles
2020 songs
Moneybagg Yo songs
Blac Youngsta songs
Interscope Records singles